K96 or K-96 may refer to:

K-96 (Kansas highway), a state highway in Kansas
HMS Aubrietia (K96), a former UK Royal Navy ship
INS Chatak (K96), a former Indian Navy ship